Niño Martin Eday (born 13 April 1993), is a Filipino mountain biker.  He was born in, and grew up in, Iloilo City, Philippines. He is specialising in Four-Cross (4X), Enduro and Downhill mountain bike racing and also a former member of the BMX National Team in the Philippines. He began riding BMX at the age of 5 and started mountain biking at the age of 15. Recently, he won the title of the UCI-DHI National Champion for Men’s Elite Category finishing with a record time of "2:34:785" from the 2019 UCI Philippine MTB National Championships race in Rizal, Philippines.

Now he is currently a brand ambassador of Commencal Philippines.

External links
Nino Martin Eday - Facebook Fanpage

References

 Niño Martin Eday was the UCI-DHI National Champion bworldonline.com. 28 May 2019. Retrieved 24 August 2019
 RED BULL PUMP TRACK WORLD CHAMPIONSHIP - PHILIPPINE QUALIFIER redbullpumptrackworldchampionship.com. 23 March 2019. Retrieved 24 August 2019
 8th Asian BMX Championship, Tampines Singapore pinoyphotography.org. 12 June 2013. Retrieved 24 August 2019
 Young daredevils of Bike.com thenewstoday.info. 15 May 2008. Retrieved 24 August 2019

1993 births
Living people
Filipino male cyclists